Boulder River Wilderness is a  wilderness area within the Mount Baker-Snoqualmie National Forest in the western Cascade Range of Washington state.

Topography
Boulder River Wilderness is made up of dense forests and steep ridges that rise to the summits of Three Fingers and Whitehorse Mountain. South Peak is also home to an old fire lookout. This high ridge bears a narrow saw-toothed profile with several sharp summits, which include Liberty, Big Bear, and Whitehorse Mountains and Salish and Buckeye Peaks, all above  in elevation. Several steep and heavily wooded ridges thrust out east and west from the central crest of the wilderness.

Boulder River, a tributary to the North Fork Stillaguamish River, is the wilderness area's primary drainage and runs approximately  through the northwest section of the wilderness.  The Long Creek Research Natural Area on the south slope of Wiley Ridge is also protected within the wilderness boundary.

Vegetation
Common vegetation in Boulder River Wilderness includes old-growth Douglas fir, true fir, western hemlock, and western red cedar, as well as bigleaf maple, alder, willow, and devil's club.  Sitka spruce can be found at the lowest elevations along the Boulder River.  The Boulder River Wilderness contains some of the last substantials tracts of lowland virgin forest in Washington state.

Wildlife
Black bears, black-tailed deer, and elk inhabit the forest, and mountain goats can be found on the rocky shelves above the tree line.

Hiking
A short trail extends up Boulder River for  through old-growth forest. Three short trails climb toward the high crest and eventually peter out. Another trail crosses the northeast corner of the Wilderness over Squire Creek Pass, with outstanding views of the high crest.

See also
 List of U.S. Wilderness Areas
 List of old-growth forests

References

External links
 Boulder River Wilderness - Mt. Baker-Snoqualmie National Forest
 Boulder River Wilderness - Wilderness.net
 Boulder River Wilderness, Washington - Backpacker Magazine

Wilderness areas of Washington (state)
Old-growth forests
Cascade Range
Protected areas of Snohomish County, Washington
Mount Baker-Snoqualmie National Forest
Protected areas established in 1984
1984 establishments in Washington (state)